Inkpen Common or Inkpen Great Common is a  biological Site of Special Scientific Interest east of Inkpen in Berkshire. It is managed as a nature reserve  by the Berkshire, Buckinghamshire and Oxfordshire Wildlife Trust.

This is a surviving fragment of the former Inkpen Common is located between the hamlets of Hell Corner and Inkpen Common. It is mainly damp heathland, with small areas of marsh, woods and bracken. Flora on the heath include purple moor grass, common gorse, lousewort, lesser dodder and the only surviving colony in Berkshire of pale heath violet.

References

 

Berkshire, Buckinghamshire and Oxfordshire Wildlife Trust
Sites of Special Scientific Interest in Berkshire